Bocaranga Airport  is an airstrip serving Bocaranga, a town in the Ouham-Pendé prefecture of the Central African Republic.

See also

Transport in the Central African Republic
List of airports in the Central African Republic

References

External links 
OpenStreetMap - Bocaranga Airport
OurAirports - Bocaranga Airport

Airports in the Central African Republic
Buildings and structures in Ouham-Pendé